The 2011–12 curling season began in September 2011 and ended in April 2012.

Note: In events with two genders, the men's tournament winners will be listed before the women's tournament winners.

CCA-sanctioned events
This section lists events sanctioned by and/or conducted by the Canadian Curling Association (CCA). The following events in bold have been confirmed by the CCA as part of the 2011–12 Season of Champions programme as of December 6, 2010. The non-bold events are events sanctioned by the CCA.

Other events
Note: Events that have not been placed on the CCA's list of sanctioned events are listed here.

World Curling Tour
Grand Slam events in bold.Note: More events may be posted as time progresses.Teams

Men's events

Women's events

WCT Order of Merit rankings

WCT Money List

The Dominion MA CupThe Dominion MA Cup presented by TSN was contested in the 2011–12 season. The Cup was awarded to the Canadian Curling Association Member Association (MA) who has had the most success during the season in CCA-sanctioned events. Events include the Canadian mixed championship, men's and women's juniors championships, the Scotties, the Brier, the men's and women's senior championships and the national wheelchair championship. Points were awarded based on placement in each of the events, with the top association receiving 14 points, then the 2nd place team with 13, etc.

Alberta won the second Dominion MA Cup, finishing first in five of the eight events, including the Scotties, and finishing second in the other three events, including the Brier. Alberta also defended its title from last year, when they tied with Saskatchewan. Saskatchewan finished in fourth place with two first-place finishes, while last year's runner-up Manitoba finished in a close third, losing second place to Ontario, which had one first-place finish.

Standings

Capital One Cup
The Capital One Cup was a season-long competition that awarded curling teams point values for their participation in Capital One Grand Slam of Curling events. At the end of the season, the men's and women's teams with the top three point values were awarded a purse of prize money. 

The points were allocated as follows:

Notable team changes

Retirements
 Kim Dolan, one of Prince Edward Island's most notable curlers, retired from competitive curling following her final Scotties appearance.
 Randy Ferbey, one of the most dominant curlers in recent history, retired from competitive curling after his team broke up.

Careers on hiatus
 Sisters Jenn Hanna and Stephanie Hanna announced that they will leave competitive curling, and do not intend to play competitively in the near future.

Team line-up changesTeams listed by skip, new teammates listed in bold''
 Mary-Anne Arsenault: Arsenault replaced current third Stephanie McVicar with former teammate and skip Colleen Jones, a six-time Canadian champion who won five championships with Arsenault. Jones will play third, while Arsenault's current second, Kim Kelly, and lead, Jennifer Baxter, will remain in their current positions.
 Cheryl Bernard: Bernard decided to drop her lead Jennifer Sadleir after only one season together due to off-ice issues. Shannon Aleksic, a Saskatchewan native who previously played for British Columbia's Kelley Law, will join the team as the new lead.
 Suzanne Birt: Robyn MacPhee, Birt's current second, decided to take a year off of competitive curling, and will be replaced by Sarah Fullerton, a former Prince Edward Island provincial junior champion.
 Jim Cotter: Third Kevin Folk has relocated to Calgary for work. Folk has been replaced by former Winnipeg skip and Russian national champion Jason Gunnlaugson, who moved to British Columbia for work.
 Brad Gushue: Third Ryan Fry left the team following the end of the 2012 Tim Hortons Brier. Brett Gallant, a former Canadian Junior champion from Prince Edward Island, will join the team as Fry's replacement. Gallant will play at second, while current second Adam Casey will play at third.
 Amber Holland: Holland parted ways with her team of Heather Kalenchuk, Tammy Schneider and Kim Schneider, and formed a new squad consisting of Dailene Sivertson, Brooklyn Lemon and Jolene Campbell. Siverston, a former British Columbia provincial junior champion, last played as Kelly Scott's second, and will play lead for Holland. Lemon, a former provincial junior champion of Saskatchewan, joins as second, and Campbell, a former skip and Holland's alternate in recent seasons, will play as third.
 Shannon Kleibrink: Longtime third Amy Nixon, who left the team in March to form her own team, was replaced by Kalynn Park, who is a former Alberta provincial junior champion. Park will play as second, while Bronwen Webster, who sat out as alternate for much of the season due to pregnancy, will be promoted from second to third following her return.
 Amy Nixon left her longtime skip Shannon Kleibrink to form a new squad consisting of Nadine Chyz, Whitney More and Tracy Bush. Chyz, who will play as third, is a former Canadian Junior champion and World Junior silver medallist. More, who will play as second, is a former Alberta provincial champion, while Bush, who will play as lead, is also a former Canadian Junior champion and World Junior silver medallist.
 Kelly Scott: Lead Jacquie Armstrong retired from curling, and second Dailene Sivertson left the team to play lead for Amber Holland. Sarah Wazney, a former Canadian Junior champion, will be joining the team at lead.
 Heather Smith-Dacey: Third Danielle Parsons left the team and was replaced by Stephanie McVicar, a former Canadian Junior silver medallist.
 Jeff Stoughton: Longtime lead Steve Gould was dropped from the team. Gould has been replaced by Olympic gold medalist Mark Nichols, who previously played with Brad Gushue.

References

See also
World Curling Tour Home
Season of Champions Home

2011-12
2011-12
Seasons in curling